Jason Sean Steele (born 18 August 1990) is an English professional footballer who plays as a goalkeeper for  club Brighton & Hove Albion.

Steele progressed through Middlesbrough's youth system, signing his first professional contract with the Premier League club in 2009. He made his professional footballing debut while on loan at League Two side Northampton Town during the 2009–10 season. Steele made his Middlesbrough debut in the 2010–11 season, and eventually became their first-choice goalkeeper within their Championship campaign, after being relegated from the top flight the season before last. Steele represented England at all youth levels; his positive performances led him to being called up to the Great Britain Olympic team for the 2012 Summer Olympic Games held in London, making a singular appearance against Brazil at the Riverside Stadium. Steele maintained his role at Middlesbrough for three seasons, though the arrivals of Dimitrios Konstantopoulos and Tomás Mejías in the 2013–14 season saw Steele's position at the club become threatened; he left at the end of that season.

In the 2014–15 season, Steele joined fellow Championship club Blackburn Rovers on loan. He then signed for them on a permanent basis at the beginning of the 2015 winter transfer window. He quickly established himself as their first-choice goalkeeper though in the 2016–17 season, Blackburn were relegated to League One, which culminated in Steele's departure to Sunderland, who were newly relegated to the Championship for the 2017–18 league campaign. Steele's tenure at Sunderland was a sour note: he lost his intended role of first-choice goalkeeper to Robbin Ruiter and then Lee Camp and the club were relegated to League One at the end of the season, which meant that both Sunderland and Steele (as a player) had suffered two consecutive relegations. The events of the season led to a Netflix documentary entitled Sunderland 'Til I Die being produced, which was released in December 2018. 

He left Sunderland after one season, joining Brighton & Hove Albion of the Premier League serving as back-up, where he eventually made his Premier League debut in November 2021.

Early life
Steele was born in Newton Aycliffe, County Durham. He attended Woodham Community Technology College (now named Woodham Academy), the same school as his former Middlesbrough teammate Ross Turnbull.

Club career

Middlesbrough
He came through Middlesbrough's youth academy. In May 2009, Steele signed a new three-year contract with Middlesbrough, which was his first professional contract. Danny Coyne was signed during Middlesbrough's first season in the Championship in the 2009–10 season, instead of promoting Steele to a permanent senior squad member. He was sent out on loan to Northampton Town in February 2010, to gain first team experience. He kept four clean sheets in 13 matches.

Thanks to his impressive stint at Northampton, Steele was handed his first competitive start for Middlesbrough in a 2–1 victory over Chesterfield in the League Cup, on 10 August 2010. He made his league debut away to Leicester City on 14 August 2010 and capped it with a clean sheet in a 0–0 draw. With the sale of Brad Jones to Liverpool, Steele went on to establish himself as Middlesbrough's first-choice goalkeeper, ahead of Danny Coyne. In December 2010, he signed a new contract with Middlesbrough up to 2015. Due to a side muscle injury he picked up against Reading in March 2011, Nottingham Forest goalkeeper Paul Smith was brought in to cover for Steele. Despite impressive performances from Smith, Steele regained his first-team spot for the last two matches of the 2010–11 season, in which he kept clean sheets in both games against Cardiff City and Doncaster Rovers.

In the 2011–12 season, he fully established himself as Middlesbrough's first-choice goalkeeper. Despite Wolverhampton Wanderers goalkeeper Carl Ikeme being brought in on loan at the start of the season, due to a broken wrist for Steele, he quickly regained his first-team place. Steele went on to win the Young Player of the Year award for the 2011–12 season.

He started the 2012–13 season well, putting in man-of-the-match performances against Ipswich Town (in which he got an assist), Watford and Brighton & Hove Albion. He continued his good form into 2013, saving a penalty against Blackpool when the score was at 3–2, and Middlesbrough went on to win the match 4–2. Steele's impressive form during the 2012/13 season, as well as his form in the previous season, was rewarded when he was named the North East Football Writers' Young player of the Year in February 2013. He finished the season being the only player to have played in every minute of Middlesbrough's league campaign. Steele also won both the Young Player and Player of the Season awards which was picked by both his teammates and staff at the club.

Blackburn Rovers
On 1 September 2014, Steele joined Championship club Blackburn Rovers on a season-long loan. He made his debut on 20 September 2014 in a 1–0 win away to Fulham. Steele quickly made an impact, which included him establishing himself as first-choice goalkeeper and making 15 league appearances during his initial loan spell. On 31 December 2014, Steele signed a permanent deal with Blackburn for an undisclosed fee, signing a three-and-a-half-year deal. At the end of the 2014–15 season, Steele made 31 appearances.

In the 2015–16 season, Steele made 41 appearances in the Championship, it was David Raya who played the other 5 matches that league campaign. That season saw Blackburn finish fifteenth, 15 points adrift from the relegation zone, as well as a managerial change occurring which saw heavily-experienced Premier League coach Paul Lambert replace Gary Bowyer. Steele was notable for his singular assist and yellow card during that Championship league campaign.

Similar playing statistics occurred the following season, in which Steele played 41 times in the Championship whereas Raya appeared 5 times. In a high points-scoring season from all 24 teams in the league, Blackburn suffered relegation to League One, finishing the Championship campaign with 51 points, only qualifying for relegation on a goal difference by 2 goals: Blackburn finishing on –12 and Nottingham Forest finishing on –10. His final game for Blackburn was a 2–0 defeat to Barnsley at Ewood Park on 8 April 2017.

Sunderland
Steele signed for newly relegated Championship club Sunderland on 26 July 2017 on a four-year contract for an undisclosed fee, reported to be in the region of £500,000. Steele made his official league debut against Derby County on 4 August, in which they recorded a 1–1 draw in the first game of the 2017–18 season. Prior to that, Steele had been between the posts in a heavy 5–0 defeat to Celtic in a pre season friendly at the Stadium of Light, in which he was criticised alongside his teammates due to their disappointing performance, which saw Sunderland bring in Robbin Ruiter to compete with Steele for the first-choice goalkeeper role.

In the winter transfer window, Steele was set to join fellow Championship side Derby County on loan, after Sunderland allowed the goalkeeper to leave on transfer deadline day following the signing of Lee Camp from Cardiff City on loan. The deal would have seen Steele join the Rams on loan until the end of the season with an obligation to a permanent deal if the club were to achieve promotion to the Premier League. However, Derby had decided to change the deal at the last minute, in which they were unprepared to complete a permanent deal, which suddenly resulted in the deal falling through.

After a very disappointing season, Sunderland were relegated to League One on 21 April 2018. This meant that Steele had suffered two consecutive relegations as a player whereas Sunderland had suffered from two consecutive relegations as a club. That season saw Steele appear for the club 15 times in the Championship. The club's negative season resulted in the production of a Netflix documentary, Sunderland 'Til I Die, released on 14 December 2018. In the documentary, Steele explained that being a professional footballer resulted in many people putting pressure on himself and the entire squad to perform at their best.

Brighton & Hove Albion
Steele signed for Premier League club Brighton & Hove Albion on 21 June 2018 on a three-year contract for an undisclosed fee. Steele eventually made his Brighton debut on 5 January 2019, in the 3–1 away win against Bournemouth in the FA Cup third round.

His next appearance for Brighton came 20 months after his debut, playing and keeping a clean sheet in a 4–0 home victory over Portsmouth in the EFL Cup on 17 September 2020. Six days later he made another appearance again keeping a clean sheet in another EFL Cup tie, this time a 2–0 away win over Preston. However, his run in the league cup was ended on 30 September after a 3–0 home loss against Manchester United falling short of a quarter final place. His next match came on 10 January 2021, where he saved four penalties in a 4–3 penalty shootout win over Newport County – after finishing 1–1 in 120 minutes of play – in the FA Cup third round. Near the end of normal play, Steele mistimed a cross which landed onto teammate Adam Webster conceding an own goal in the 90+6th minute taking it to extra time. A day later Steele extended his Brighton contract signing on until June 2023.

He captained the side for the first time and kept a clean sheet in Brighton's 2–0 EFL Cup second round away victory at Cardiff City on 24 August 2021. Steele made his Premier League debut at the age of 31, after three years at The Albion, replacing the suspended Robert Sánchez in the away fixture at Aston Villa on 20 November, where Brighton lost 2–0.

Steele made two crucial saves in a superb display away against Arsenal in the EFL Cup third round on 9 November 2022, where Brighton stunned the Gunners to a 3–1 victory.
On 7 January 2023, Steele played in the 5–1 away win over his former club Middlesbrough – where he started his career – cruising through to the FA Cup fourth round.
Three days later, it was confirmed by Brighton that Steele had signed a new contract with the club, committing his future in Sussex until June 2025. Roberto De Zerbi was eager for Steele to stay on the south coast with the goalkeeper reacting "When a manager of Roberto's stature is telling you that, then there's not even a decision to be made," with signing on an easy decision. On 29 January, Steele was chosen to play over Sánchez where Brighton went on to beat defending champions Liverpool 2–1 at home in the fourth round of the FA Cup. He was selected ahead of the Spanish goalkeeper again on 4 March, this time in a Premier League tie at home against West Ham. This was Steele's second Premier League appearance of his career – his first coming in November 2021 – keeping his first top flight clean sheet, making crucial saves to keep out the London club in the 4–0 win. Steele was giving an extended run of game time, with De Zerbi saying he was "sad for Robert" [Sánchez] but that Steele is "playing better" and "maybe he is closer than Robert in my style." After a 2–2 away draw against Leeds United 
on 11 March, he earned his second clean sheet four days later, in his second Premier League game at Falmer Stadium in the 1–0 home win over bitter rivals Crystal Palace.

International career

England youth
Steele has competed for the England under-16s, under-17s and under-19s. He joined the under-19s in September 2007, a month after his 17th birthday. In July 2009, Steele competed as starting goalkeeper for England under-19s in the 2009 UEFA European Under-19 Championship in Ukraine. Steele captained the team against the hosts, Ukraine.

Steele made his first under-21s appearance on 16 November 2010, in a 2–0 away defeat to Germany in a friendly. He was sent off after 58 minutes after fouling Boris Vukčević, having only come on as a half-time substitute. His second appearance for the under-21s came almost two years later on 10 September 2012 as a starter in a 2013 UEFA European Under-21 Championship qualification match against Norway, in which he kept a clean sheet in a 1–0 win.

Steele was named in the 23-man squad for the 2013 UEFA European Under-21 Championship. He made one appearance at the tournament, playing in a 1–0 defeat to Israel in England's last group match. He made seven appearances for the under-21s from 2010 to 2013.

Great Britain Olympic
Steele was named in the 18-man Great Britain squad for the 2012 Summer Olympics in London. He started in a friendly against Brazil before the tournament, playing the first half of a 2–0 defeat at the Riverside Stadium. He was the only member of the squad to not play during the tournament, with Jack Butland keeping him out of the team, and was an unused substitute in all four matches as Great Britain reached the quarter-final.

Personal life
In the documentary series Sunderland 'Til I Die, it was shown that Steele has two sons. Steele is related to fellow footballer Lewis Wing who plays for Wycombe Wanderers. He too was a former Middlesbrough player, but were at the club at separate times.

Career statistics

Club

Honours
England U19
UEFA European Under-19 Championship runner-up: 2009

References

External links

1990 births
Living people
People from Newton Aycliffe
Footballers from County Durham
English footballers
England youth international footballers
England under-21 international footballers
Association football goalkeepers
Middlesbrough F.C. players
Northampton Town F.C. players
Blackburn Rovers F.C. players
Sunderland A.F.C. players
Brighton & Hove Albion F.C. players
English Football League players
Olympic footballers of Great Britain
Footballers at the 2012 Summer Olympics